Khai khrop (also spelt as kai krob) or khai khu is a traditional food product from Songkhla in Southern Thailand. It is made by putting two duck egg yolks into an egg shell that was cut into half, preserved by soaking in brine. Khai khrop are steamed before being eaten with rice or khao tom, or cooked with other foods. Through the process, the yolk becomes hardened with a salty flavor.

History 
In the fishing villages of Songkhla Province, people make fishnets from unbleached cotton yarn. To prevent the threads in the net from getting frayed, and to help it sink in the water, the net is regularly treated with egg white from duck eggs. This creates leftover yolks, and so they are preserved as khai khrop. (ครูฑูรย์, 2012)

Methods

Traditional 
The traditional method for producing khai khrop is to cut the duck egg shell into half, add salt to the base of the shell, put two yolks in a shell and add salt again on top then dry it in sunlight for several days. If there is no time for sun-drying, the leftover egg shell is used as a cover to protect the yolks from  insects and dirt. This process become the name of khai khrop. In Thai, khai means "egg" and khrop means "cover" (Remawadee, 2010). After the sun-drying process is complete, khai khrop is cooked by steaming, which makes it last for several days.

Modern 
Nowadays, khai khrop is still popular and has become a commercial food not only for preserved yolks anymore. It's needed faster and cleaner method to produce. Firstly, clean duck eggs by water then peel the top of egg shell out just in the scale that yolk can flow out easily. After that, separate yolk and egg white by hand. Put yolks altogether in the clear water. Lift two yolks up by hand and put them in the egg shell that was trimmed the top part out widely enough to put two yolk in, add brine into it. After that, cover to protect them from dirt (To be faster, they no longer use egg shell to cover back but use bigger covering to cover many of them at once) and let it sit for several hours. Cook by streaming (The yolks are cooked through but soft and near liquid at the center), then khai khrop are ready for consumption (ครูฑูรย์, 2012).

Uses 

Khai khrop can be eaten without further preparation, on their own or as a side dish. In southern Thailand, local people eat khai khrop as a side dish with rice and curry, or with khao tom. In some area, khai khrops are sliced, mixed with chopped vegetables, chopped chilli, soy sauce, sugar and lime juice to become a spicy salad.

Khai khrop are very similar to salted duck eggs but they have no egg white and the yolks are softer and less salty.

See also 
List of egg dishes
List of steamed foods
Salted duck egg
Century egg

References

Citations 
Monkeytan. (2014, May 15). Mthai food. Retrieved January 11, 2017, from http://food.mthai.com: http://food.mthai.com/food-inbox/90416.html
Remawadee. (2010, May 14). ไข่ครอบ หัวเขา สงขลา. Retrieved from remawadee.com: http://www.remawadee.com/songkra/Cover-Eggs.html
 
ครูฑูรย์. (2012, January 10). ไข่คู่ - ไข่ครอบ. Retrieved January 22, 2017, from GotoKnow: https://www.gotoknow.org/posts/459943
รัตนะ, ส. (2013, November 9). 'ไข่ครอบหัวเขา'โอท็อปสงขลา. Retrieved January 22, 2017, from Komchadluek: https://web.archive.org/web/20181211115838/http://www.komchadluek.net/news/lifestyle/172312

Egg dishes
Thai cuisine
Pickles